Belle Alliance is an unincorporated community in Assumption Parish, Louisiana, United States. It is part of the Pierre Part Micropolitan Statistical Area.

History
Belle Alliance is named after the Belle Alliance Plantation located on the east bank of Bayou Lafourche in Assumption Parish, about five miles (8 km) out of Donaldsonville. During the 1770s, this  plot was granted to Don Juan Vives, a physician and military officer of the Spanish government. The actual Belle Alliance Plantation was built by a successful sugar planter Charles Anton Kock, also owner of St. Emma Plantation around 1846.

Today, the site is known as the community of Belle Alliance. The plantation is listed on the National Register of Historic Places.

References

Populated places established in 1846
Unincorporated communities in Louisiana
Unincorporated communities in Assumption Parish, Louisiana
1846 establishments in Louisiana